Storeria dekayi, commonly known as De Kay's brown snake, De Kay's snake, and simply the brown snake (along with many others), is a small non-venomous species of snake in the family Colubridae. The species is native to North America and Central America.

Geographic range
S. dekayi is native to Southern Ontario and Quebec, most of the eastern half of the United States, through Mexico, Guatemala, Honduras, and possibly El Salvador. More specifically, this common species inhabits most wetland and terrestrial habitats east of the Great Plains from sea level to 1,400 meters (4,600 feet) above sea level.

Description
Dorsally, S. dekayi is brown to gray with a lighter center stripe bordered by small black spots; ventrally, it is lighter brown or pink with small black dots at the ends of the ventral scales. The dorsal scales are keeled, and it has no loreal scale.

Reproduction
Like other natricine snakes such as water snakes (genus Nerodia) and garter snakes (genus Thamnophis), S. dekayi is a viviparous species, giving birth to live young. Sexual maturity is reached at two to three years. Mating takes place in the spring, after snakes emerge from brumation. Between 3 and 41 young are born in late summer.

Diet
S. dekayi primarily feeds on slugs, snails, and earthworms. In the southern extent of its region the snake usually preys predominantly on earthworms, however in the northern reaches of its range slugs are the predominant food source. It has specialized jaws that allow it to remove snails from their shells for consumption. Reports of other invertebrates (such as woodlice, mites, or millipedes) in the diet of S. dekayi are more than likely the result of accidental ingestion rather than intentional feeding, in which one of these invertebrates may have adhered to a slug or other prey item being consumed.

Ecology
S. dekayi is a prey item for larger snakes, large frogs and toads, birds, and many mammals including weasels.

Etymology
The specific name, dekayi, is in honor of American zoologist James Ellsworth De Kay (1792–1851), who collected the first specimen on Long Island, New York, while the generic name, Storeria, honors zoologist David Humphreys Storer.

This is the only North American snake whose binomial is a double honorific – that is, both the generic name and the specific name honor people.

References

External links
Brown Snake, Reptiles and Amphibians of Iowa.

Further reading
Behler JL, King FW (1979). The Audubon Society Field Guide to North American Reptiles and Amphibians. New York: Knopf. 743 pp. . (Storeria dekayi, pp. 654–655 + Plate 550).
Boulenger GA (1893). Catalogue of the Snakes in the British Museum (Natural History). Volume I., Containing the Families ... Colubridæ Aglyphæ, part. London: Trustees of the British Museum (Natural History). (Taylor and Francis, printers). xiii + 448 pp. + Plates I-XXVIII. (Ischnognathus dekayi, pp. 286–287).
Clausen, H.J. (1936). "Observations on the Brown Snake Storeria dekayi (Holbrook), with especial Reference to the Habits and Birth of Young". Copeia 1936: 98-102.
Conant, Roger; Bridges, William (1939). What Snake is That? A Field Guide to the Snakes of the United States East of the Rocky Mountains. (With 108 drawings by Edmond Malnate). New York and London: D. Appleton-Century. Frontispiece map +  viii + 163 pp. + Plates A-C, 1-32. (Storeria dekayi, pp. 108–110 + Plate C, Figure 14; Plate 21, Figure 60).
Goin, Coleman J.; Goin, Olive B.; Zug, George R. (1978). Introduction to  Herpetology: Third Edition. San Francisco: W.H. Freeman. xi + 378 pp. . (Storeria dekayi, p. 117).
Holbrook JE (1842). North American Herpetology; or, a Description of the Reptiles Inhabiting the United States. Vol. IV. Philadelphia: J. Dobson. 136 pp. (Tropidonotus dekayi, new combination, pp. 53–55 & Plate XIV opposite p. 53).
Morris, Percy A. (1948). Boy's Book of Snakes: How to Recognize and Understand Them. (A volume of the Humanizing Science Series, edited by Jaques Cattell). New York: Ronald Press. viii + 185 pp. (Storeria dekayi dekayi, pp. 26–28, 180).
Powell R, Conant R, Collins JT (2016). Peterson Field Guide to Reptiles and Amphibians of Eastern and Central North America, Fourth Edition. Boston and New York: Houghton Mifflin Harcourt. xiv + 494 pp. . (Storeria dekayi, pp. 423–424, Figures 192-193 + Plate 42).
Zim HS, Smith HM (1956). Reptiles and Amphibians: A Guide to Familiar American Species. A Golden Nature Guide. New York: Simon and Schuster. 160 pp. (Storeria dekayi pp. 106, 156).

Storeria
Snakes of North America
Reptiles of Canada
Reptiles of the United States
Snake, Brown
Fauna of the Great Lakes region (North America)
Reptiles of Mexico
Snakes of Central America
Reptiles of Guatemala
Reptiles of Honduras
Extant Pleistocene first appearances
Reptiles described in 1836
Taxa named by John Edwards Holbrook